Ben (also Romanized as Bain and Ban) is a city in the Central District of Ben County, Chaharmahal and Bakhtiari province, Iran, and serves as capital of the county. At the 2006 census, its population was 11,699 in 3,141 households, when it was a city in Shahrekord County before the establishment of Ben County. The following census in 2011 counted 11,775 people in 3,534 households. The latest census in 2016 showed a population of 12,971 people in 4,049 households, by which time it became the capital of the new county. The city is populated by Turkic people with a small Persian minority.

Notable people 

 Habib Esfahani

References 

Ben County

Cities in Chaharmahal and Bakhtiari Province

Populated places in Chaharmahal and Bakhtiari Province

Populated places in Ben County